Elections to the Reichstag of the North German Confederation were held on 31 August 1867, with run-off elections during the following weeks. The National Liberal Party continued to serve as the largest party, winning 81 seats. These were the first regular and last elections during the North German Confederation. In July 1870 the Reichstag members decided not to hold new elections during the Franco-Prussian war, in spite of the three-year period.

Electoral system
The North German Confederation were divided into 297 single-member electoral constituencies, of which 236 were in Prussia. All men over the age of 25 and not in receipt of public assistance were eligible to vote.

Results

References

1867 08
Germany
1867 elections in Germany
August 1867 events